Curtis Shears (July 4, 1901 – July 30, 1988) was an American fencer. He won a bronze medal in the team épée event at the 1932 Summer Olympics.

References

External links
 

1901 births
1988 deaths
American male épée fencers
Fencers at the 1932 Summer Olympics
Olympic bronze medalists for the United States in fencing
Sportspeople from Omaha, Nebraska
Medalists at the 1932 Summer Olympics